The 2007 Bulgarian Supercup was the fifth Bulgarian Supercup match, a football match which was contested between the "A" professional football group champion, Levski Sofia, and the runner-up of Bulgarian Cup, Litex Lovech. The match was held on 26 July 2007 at the Vasil Levski National Stadium in Sofia, Bulgaria. Levski beat Litex 2–1 after extra time to win their second Bulgarian Supercup.

Match details

2007
PFC Levski Sofia matches
PFC Litex Lovech matches
Supercup